Kibunea minuta is a species of beetle in the family Elateridae and the genus Kibunea.

References

External links
Information and Images of Kibunea minuta

Beetles described in 1758
Elateridae
Taxa named by Carl Linnaeus